AD 56 (LVI) was a leap year starting on Thursday (link will display the full calendar) of the Julian calendar. At the time, it was known in the Roman Empire as the Year of the Consulship of Saturninus and Scipio (or, less frequently, year 809 Ab urbe condita). The denomination AD 56 for this year has been used since the early medieval period, when the Anno Domini calendar era became the prevalent method in Europe for naming years.

Events

By place

Roman Empire 
 War between Rome and Parthia breaks out due to the invasion of Armenia by King Vologases I, who has replaced the Roman-supported ruler with his brother Tiridates I of Armenia. (approximate date)
 Publius Clodius Thrasea Paetus becomes a consul in Rome.

Asian Calendar 
 The Jianwu era of the Eastern Han Dynasty changes to the Jianwuzhongyuan era.

Religion

The apostle Paul writes his second Epistle to the Corinthians, probably from Filippi 
The apostle Paul writes his Epistle to the Romans,from Korinth

Births 
 Gaius Cornelius Tacitus, Roman historian (approximate date)

Deaths 
 Lucius Volusius Saturninus, Roman politician and governor

References 

0056